Charles Deruyter (27 January 1890 – 24 January 1955) was a Belgian professional road and track racing cyclist. His best results on the road included second place in the 1913 Paris–Roubaix and the 1923 Tour of Flanders, and winning the only edition of the Circuit des Champs de Bataille held as a stage race, in 1919.

References

Belgian male cyclists
Road racing cyclists
Belgian track cyclists
1890 births
1955 deaths
People from Wattrelos
Cyclists from Hauts-de-France
Sportspeople from Nord (French department)